Jaroslav Melichárek (born 22 December 1977) is rally driver from Slovakia. As of December 2013 he had made 58 starts. He became Slovak Rally Champion in 2015.

Career results

WRC results

References

External links 
eWRC-results.com profile

1977 births
Living people
Slovak racing drivers
World Rally Championship drivers